Fernando Velázquez may refer to:
Fernando Velázquez Vigil (1950-2002), a Cuban artist specialising in ceramics and painting.
Fernando Velázquez (composer) (1976-), a Spanish composer of concert and orchestral music.